6 Train can refer to:
6 (New York City Subway service)
Paris Métro Line 6
Line 6 (Beijing Subway)
Line 6 (Shanghai Metro)

See also
Line 6 (disambiguation)